Sir Ralph Percy (11 August 1425 – 25 April 1464) was an English nobleman of the House of Percy, a knight, a Governor of Bamburgh Castle and a supporter of the Lancastrian faction in the Wars of the Roses. Percy was the son of Henry Percy, 2nd Earl of Northumberland and Lady Eleanor Neville, and the grandson of Sir Henry "Hotspur" Percy.

Family

Percy married, firstly, Eleanor Acton and they had six children:
 Sir Ralph Percy
 Peter Percy
 Sir Henry Percy
 George Percy
 John Percy
 Margaret Percy

Sir Ralph married, secondly Jane Teye. They had a child, Catherine Percy.

Career
Ralph was born on 11 August 1425 to Henry Percy, 2nd Earl of Northumberland and Eleanor Neville, Countess of Northumberland. He had three brothers, Henry, Thomas and Richard. 
Ralph, Thomas and Richard participated in the Percy-Neville feud, fighting at Stamford Bridge, where he and Thomas  were taken prisoner in 1454. He was freed after Henry VI regained his sanity and the Duke of York dismissed as protector. 
His father was killed at the First Battle of St Albans in 1455, and four years later the Yorkists were charged with treason, and they fled, following the Rout of Ludford Bridge. However, when they returned, Thomas was killed at the Battle of Northampton. Queen Margaret raised an army in the north, and the Percies joined her. Following victories at the Battle of Worksop and the Battle of Wakefield, where York was killed, and a victory at the Second Battle of St Albans, the Lancastrian cause was on the rise, but, at the disastrous Battle of Towton, his brothers were killed and he went into exile   
During 1462 and 1463, the Lancastrians attempted to destabilise the kingdom, ruled by their Yorkist enemy, Edward IV.  These attempts were concentrated in the north of England and directed by the Lancastrian Queen, Margaret of Anjou (Henry VI's wife).

The Earl of Warwick led campaigns to neutralise the Lancastrians in the north in the early 1460s. As a result, Sir Ralph Percy surrendered Bamburgh Castle to Edward IV, on Christmas Eve 1462 in return for a free pardon. Sir Ralph swore allegiance to Edward IV and, as part of Edward IV's policy of conciliation, Percy's lands were then returned to him. Sir Ralph took control of both Bamburgh and Dunstanburgh Castles, under his surrender agreement with Edward.

Fighting in the north continued, exacerbated by a Scottish invasion led by James III, Margaret of Anjou and Henry VI in 1463. When the Scots sued for peace, Lord Montague was sent to arrange terms. On 25 April 1464, Montague was on his way to Norham. The Duke of Somerset (who had surrendered and sworn allegiance with Percy) and Percy, forswearing their oaths, attacked Montague with 5,000 men. The site of that battle was Hedgeley Moor, seven miles south of Wooler. Percy led Somerset's vanguard and was killed.

Ancestry

References

 
 

1425 births
1464 deaths
English military personnel killed in action
People of the Wars of the Roses
Ralph Percy
Younger sons of earls